BBC World News is an international English-language pay television network, operated under the BBC Global News Limited division of the BBC, which is a public corporation of the UK government's Department for Digital, Culture, Media and Sport. According to its corporate PR, the combined seven channels of the Global News operations have the largest audience market share among all of its rivals, with an estimated 99 million viewers weekly in 2016/2017, part of the estimated 121 million weekly audience of all its operations.

Launched on 11 March 1991 as BBC World Service Television outside Europe, its name was changed to BBC World on 16 January 1995 and to BBC World News on 21 April 2008. It broadcasts news bulletins, documentaries, lifestyle programmes and interview shows. Unlike the BBC's domestic channels, it is owned and operated by BBC Global News Ltd, part of the BBC's commercial group of companies, and is funded by subscription and advertising revenues, not by the United Kingdom television licence.

The channel is not broadcast in the UK, though BBC World News reports and programming are also used by the BBC News channel. It is distinct from the BBC Studios operations. The linear service is aimed at the overseas market, in a similar manner to RT, Al Jazeera, and France 24.

In July 2022, the BBC made the decision to merge both BBC News (for UK audiences) and BBC World News (for international audiences) as one news network, under the name BBC News. The channel is set to be launched in April 2023 and will include news from both the UK and around the world.

History

The channel originally started as BBC World Service Television and was a commercial operation. The British government refused to fund the new television service using grant-in-aid. (BBC World Service radio was funded by a grant-in-aid from the Foreign, Commonwealth and Development Office until 2014.) The channel started broadcasting on 11 March 1991, after two weeks of real-time pilots, initially as a half-hour bulletin once a day at 19:00 GMT.

On Thursday, 26 January 1995 at 19:00 GMT, BBC World Service Television was split into two services:
BBC World started broadcasting on Monday, 16 January 1995 at 19:00 GMT and became a 24-hour English free-to-air international news channel.
BBC Prime started broadcasting on Monday, 30 January 1995 at 19:00 GMT and became the BBC's light entertainment channel, later renamed BBC Entertainment.

BBC World's on-air design was changed significantly on 3 April 2000, bringing it closer to the look of its sister channel in the UK which was then known as BBC News 24, the on-air look of which had been redesigned in 1999. The look of both channels was made up of red and cream and designed by Lambie-Nairn, with music based on a style described as 'drums and beeps' composed by David Lowe, a departure from the general orchestral nature of music used by other news programmes.

On 8 December 2003 a second makeover, using the same 'drums and beeps' style music but new graphics took place, although on a much smaller scale to that of 2000. The music was changed slightly while the main colour scheme became black and red, with studios using frosted glass and white and red colours. Later in 2004, the channel's slogan became Putting News First, replacing Demand a Broader View.

The channel's present name BBC World News was introduced on 21 April 2008 as part of a £550,000 rebranding of the BBC's overall news output and visual identity. BBC World News later moved to the renovated studio vacated by BBC News 24 (now the BBC News Channel). New graphics were produced by the Lambie-Nairn agency and music reworked by David Lowe.

Move to Broadcasting House
BBC World News relocated to Broadcasting House from its previous home at Television Centre on 14 January 2013. This was part of the move of BBC News and other audio and vision departments of the BBC into one building in Central London. Broadcasting House was refurbished at a cost of £1 billion. A new newsroom and several state-of-the-art studios were built.

Broadcasting
Live news output originates from studios B, C and E in Broadcasting House with some recorded programming from Broadcasting House studios A  and D and the BBC Millbank studio, as well as Singapore and Washington. The BBC World News newsroom is now part of the new consolidated BBC Newsroom in Broadcasting House along with BBC World Service and UK domestic news services.

Previously, the channel was broadcast in 4:3, with the news output fitted into a 14:9 frame for both digital and analogue broadcasting, resulting in black bands at the top and bottom of the screen. On 13 January 2009 at 09:57 GMT, BBC World News switched its broadcast to 16:9 format, initially in Europe on Astra 1L satellite, and Eutelsat Hot Bird 6 satellite to other broadcast feeds in the Asian region from 20 January 2009. The channel ceased broadcasting on analogue satellite on 18 April 2006.

High-definition
As a result of the move to Broadcasting House, BBC World News gained high-definition studios and equipment to be able to broadcast in high-definition. On 5 August 2013, BBC World News was offered as a High Definition (HD) feed across the Middle East when it launched its international HD channel on the Arab Satellite Communications Organization. Arabsat was the BBC's first distribution partner in the Middle East to offer the channel in HD. On 1 April 2015 BBC World News in English started broadcasting in high definition from the 11.229 GHz/V transponder on Astra 1KR at the 19.2°E orbital position, available free-to-air to viewers with 60 cm dishes across Europe and coastal North Africa.

Worldwide
BBC World News claims to be watched by a weekly audience of 74 million in over 200 countries and territories worldwide. BBC World News is most commonly watched as a free-to-air (FTA) channel. The channel is available in Europe and many parts of the world via subscription television providers in cable, satellite, IPTV and streaming platforms.

In the United States, the channel is available through providers such as Cablevision, Comcast, Spectrum, Verizon Fios, and U-verse TV. As of 2014, US distribution and advertising sales for the channel are handled by AMC Networks, who are the minority partner for the BBC's entertainment channel BBC America.

In addition, BBC World News syndicates its daytime and evening news programmes to public television stations throughout the US, originally maintaining a distribution partnership with Garden City, New York-based WLIW that lasted from 1998 until October 2008, when the BBC and WLIW mutually decided not to renew the contract. BBC World News subsequently entered into an agreement with Community Television of Southern California, Inc., in which Los Angeles PBS member station KCET (which was a public independent station from 2011 to 2018) would take over distribution rights to BBC World News America (the KCET agreement has since been extended to encompass a half-hour simulcast of the 90-minute-long midday news bulletin GMT, which airs in the US as a morning show, and a weekly edition of the BBC newsmagazine Newsnight). Since June 2019, broadcasting of BBC news programming is handled by WETA-TV. PBS separately began distributing another programme aired by the channel, Beyond 100 Days, as a tape-delayed late night broadcast on 2 January 2018, as an interim replacement for Charlie Rose. Unlike GMT and BBC World News America, Beyond 100 Days is distributed exclusively to PBS member stations as part of the service's base schedule.

China banned BBC World News in 2021—although access had already been heavily restricted before then, and what was carried was censored with parts of the show being blacked out by censors operating live. It was banned owing to its coverage of the Uyghur genocide and in retaliation for CGTN's ban from the British market for violating national broadcast regulations.

Online
The channel is available in the US as part of Sling's World News add-on package.

BBC World News was available on LiveStation from 2012 until the platform closed in 2016.

United Kingdom
TV platforms in the UK (i.e. Freeview, Sky, BT TV, Freesat, Virgin) do not officially offer BBC World News as a standalone full-time channel because it carries and is funded by advertising (BBC's domestic channels are funded by a television licence fee which households and establishments that want to watch television programmes as they are being broadcast must pay), although it can be easily received due to its 'free-to-air' status on many European satellite systems, including Astra and Hot Bird and is available in selected London hotels. BBC World News can also be viewed in the public areas of Broadcasting House (the lobby and café).

However, some BBC World News programmes are officially available to UK audiences. Such programmes air on the BBC's domestic channels, and some are available on demand on the BBC's iPlayer. From 00.00 to 05.00 UK time, the top-of-the-hour news bulletins on BBC World News are simulcast on the BBC News Channel. At 01.30 weekdays, Asia Business Report and Sport Today also air on both channels. There is a simulcast of the 05:00 UK edition of The Briefing and Business Briefing on BBC One and the BBC News channel. This programme was previously branded as The World Today (later a generic BBC World News bulletin) and World Business Report respectively. At 08.30 UK time, Worklife airs on the BBC News Channel. BBC World News also produces a version of Outside Source at 21:00 UK time Monday-Thursday (seen on the BBC News Channel), World News Today at 19:00 Monday-Friday (seen on BBC Four), and 21:00 Friday-Sunday (seen on the BBC News Channel). World News Today replaced The World, which had been broadcast as a simulcast on BBC Four between 2002 and 2007.

The COVID-19 pandemic saw an increase of simulcasts between BBC News and BBC World News with simulcasting now running through the morning (10am to 11am) also shared with BBC Two, and the evening (7pm to 8pm & 9pm to 10pm) The additional simulcasting was made permanent in August 2020. Consequently, the two channels now simulcast between each day 10:00 to 11:00 and on weekdays 19:00 to 06:00, apart from the BBC News at Ten and for hour at 20:00, and between 21:00 to 06:00, apart from the evening BBC One bulletin, over the weekend.

Both World and the BBC News Channel have also occasionally had to simulcast the same news programme due to strike action or technical issues; this occurred in 2003 when Television Centre in London was affected by electrical problems.

On 26 May 2022, as part of planned cuts and streamlining across the broadcaster, the BBC announced plans for a further consolidation of content between the two services, which will both be rebranded as BBC News. The domestic and international versions would share a larger amount of content, while maintaining the ability for opt-outs when necessary.

Programming
Live news programmes:
BBC World News – International news.
Live – International news, including business and sport.
Impact – Global news as it affects audiences in Asia.
Global – International news and analysis.
Outside Source – Discussion and analysis of news topics.
Newsday – Live from Singapore, news and analysis from both an Asian and global perspective.
BBC World News America – News from America and around the world, live from the BBC's Washington DC bureau.
Focus on Africa – BBC World News' flagship African news programme, with news, business and sport from the continent.
The Context – Christian Fraser in London reports on international news, with a focus on the UK, Europe and the US (previously called 100 Days, 100 Days +, Beyond 100 Days and BBC News with Katy and Christian).
World News Today – A daily news programme with in-depth analysis. Focus on the UK, Europe, Middle East and Africa. Presenters include Nancy Kacungira, Karin Giannone, Kasia Madera, Alpa Patel and Philippa Thomas.
The Briefing – Sally Bundock with news, business, and sport.
Sunday with Laura Kuenssberg - Interviews and analysis of the weeks big news from the UK and around the world stories, including interviews with key politicians and personalities from all walks of life.

Live business and sport programmes:
Worklife
World Business Report
Asia Business Report – live from Singapore.
Sport Today – international sports news and results.

Pre-recorded programmes:
Click – technology programme aimed at non-technical audiences.
Dateline London – foreign correspondents based in London discuss the week's international news.
The Travel Show
HARDtalk – in-depth interviews with personalities from all walks of life.
Newsnight – weekly highlights from the daily domestic news programme.
Our World – documentaries
Panorama – current affairs programme, featuring interviews and investigative reports on a wide variety of subjects.
Reporters – weekly - reports from the BBC's correspondents.
Talking Movies

World News bulletins

Half-hour BBC World News bulletins are made available to PBS stations in the US through Los Angeles' KCET, a non-commercial independent public television station which has been separate from PBS since the beginning of 2011 due to a rights fee dispute (it returned to being a minor PBS member station in 2019 after a merger with the major PBS member station in the market). 80 to 90% of Americans are able to receive the bulletins, with PBS member stations having scheduling discretion. The programme is broadcast on several PBS stations in markets such as New York City and Washington DC.

On PBS stations, BBC World News is not broadcast with traditional commercials (the breaks are filled with news stories) but omits the Met Office international weather forecast at the end of the programme, replacing it with underwriting announcements. The PBS broadcasts are tape-delayed on some stations.

BBC America formerly aired a three-hour block of BBC World News programmes from 05:00 to 08:00 on weekdays until the stabilisation of the network's carriage in the United States. Met Office forecasts were removed, and it was broadcast with advertisements.

Many airlines from across the world also play pre-recorded extracts of the BBC World News, have text headlines from it or have a full bulletin available on the in-flight entertainment systems.

Previous bulletins
Another BBC World News programme, the hour-long BBC World News America, aired on BBC America at 19:00 Eastern Time Zone. A second broadcast at 22:00 Eastern Time ended in 2010 when BBC America introduced a second feed for the western time zones of the US on 18 February 2011, it was announced that BBC World News America would no longer be broadcast on BBC America and would instead be broadcast only on BBC World and local PBS stations in the US as a 30-minute programme.

The channel also produced short bulletins for public transport services in Singapore and Hong Kong:
Singapore Mass Rapid Transit service from Marina Bay to Changi International Airport
Hong Kong MTR service from Chek Lap Kok International Airport-Disneyland Resort station to Disneyland Resort line

These broadcasts began with the statement: "Welcome to BBC World News on board the Singapore Mass Rapid Transit and Hong Kong MTR". The short bulletin was updated twice a day, and has since been replaced by a similar programme from Mediacorp's CNA.

Travellers on the Heathrow Express rail service between London Paddington and Heathrow Airport could watch a summary of the headlines from BBC World News on the LCD screens provided.

News presenters

Former presenters

Samira Ahmed
Karen Bowerman
Tony Campion
Jonathan Charles
Stephen Cole
James Dagwell
Dharshini David
Martine Dennis
Juliet Dunlop
Maya Even
Adrian Finighan
Rico Hizon
Donald MacCormick
Anita McNaught
Richard Quest
Daniela Ritorto
Owen Thomas
Alastair Yates

Presentation

BBC World News is, for the most part, the same channel all over the world; the commercials are intended to be the only differences. However, there are some regional programming variations. For example, a number of programmes are made exclusively for regional viewings, such as Indian feeds, and The Record Europe, which is only broadcast in Europe. Also, the weather forecasts focus more on the area the viewer is watching from.

On most feeds of BBC World News, when there are no commercials being inserted by the cable or satellite provider similar to other channels, the break filler shows promotions for upcoming programmes on the channel. During BBC News, a news story that has not been promoted airs during what would be the television advertisement. This is the case on the broadband versions of BBC World News, and on versions of BBC World News aired in the US on PBS stations. However, there are some global commercials and sponsorships which air throughout the network.

On 11 September 2007, the break filler was redesigned and now more closely resembles previous versions. The promotional videos now fill the entire screen and are interspersed with news and market updates, schedules, and other information. There is also no longer a unifying music composition. Instead, each 20-second promotional video uses music selected from a handful of themes, which have some unifying musical characteristics. The information screens, such as the 10-second plug for the website or YouTube channel, and the 15-second weather/time/coming up screens each feature their own theme. The colour theme was updated following the relaunch of the channel in April 2008.

Since its inception, and more so since its extensive association with the BBC News channel, the countdown to the hourly news bulletin has been a feature of the channel's presentation, accompanied by music composed by David Lowe. The current style of countdown features reporters and technical staff in many different locations working to bring news stories to air. The countdown can range from 45 seconds to as little as 3 seconds.

Awards
BBC World News was named Best International News Channel at the Association for International Broadcasting Awards in November 2006. It won a Peabody Award in 2007 for White Horse Village and another in 2009 for Where Giving Life is a Death Sentence.

References

External links

BBC World News
BBC News channels
International BBC television channels
Television channels and stations established in 1995
Television channels in the Netherlands
Television channels in Belgium
Television channels in Flanders
Television channels in North Macedonia
Multilingual news services
24-hour television news channels in the United Kingdom
1995 establishments in the United Kingdom
International broadcasters
Television censorship in China
Television channels and stations disestablished in 2023
2023 disestablishments in the United Kingdom